The 1976–77 FIBA European Champions Cup was the 20th edition of the European top-tier level professional basketball club competition FIBA European Champions Cup (now called EuroLeague). The Final was held at the Pionir Hall, in Belgrade, Yugoslavia, on April 7, 1977. Maccabi Elite Tel Aviv defeated Mobilgirgi Varese, by a score of 78–77. This year saw a competition system change, as FIBA opted to replace classic knock-out round qualifications with a group stage.

Competition system

 24 teams (European national domestic league champions, plus the then current title holders), playing in a tournament system, entered a Quarterfinals group stage, divided into six groups that played a round-robin. The final standing was based on individual wins and defeats. In the case of a tie between two or more teams after the group stage, the following criteria were used to decide the final classification: 1) number of wins in one-to-one games between the teams; 2) basket average between the teams; 3) general basket average within the group
 The 6 group winners of the Quarterfinal Group Stage advanced to the Semifinal Group Stage, which was played as a single group under the same round-robin rules.
 The group winner and the runner-up of the Semifinal Group Stage qualified for the final, which was played at a predetermined venue.

Quarterfinals group stage

Semifinals group stage

Final
April 7, Pionir Hall, Belgrade

|}

Awards

FIBA European Champions Cup Finals Top Scorer
 Jim Boatwright ( Maccabi Elite Tel Aviv)

References

External links
1976–77 FIBA European Champions Cup
 1976–77 FIBA European Champions Cup
 Champions Cup 1976–77 Line-ups and Stats

EuroLeague seasons
FIBA